Mughal Serai is a caravanserai situated at village Shambhu on Sher Shah Suri Marg, near Rajpura at .

History
The serai was built during Sher Shah Suri's reign along with many others caravanserais during the construction of Grand Trunk Road in the 16th century. It provided shelter to travelers on the journey between Lahore and Delhi.

Sher Shah paid great attention to the development of the means of communication and transportation. His name is intimately associated with the construction of roads and highways on a large scale. The longest of his roads was the one running from Sunargaon to the Indus. Besides this, there were many other important roads which were so dexterously planted that they linked almost all the strategic cities of the empire to the Imperial Capital. Of them, three deserve specific mention at this place: (1) from Agra to Burhanpur, (2) from Agra via Bianah to the borders of Marwar, and (3) from Lahore to Multan. On both sides of these roads shady trees were planted and at intervals serais were constructed for the comfort and convenience of travellers. Each of the serais had a well, a mosque and a garden in it. It was looked after by a set of officers, viz., r *a,h Imam, a Mu'azzin and some watermen, appointed by the State* Inside.

Preserved landmark
It has been well-maintained by the Punjab Archaeology Department as a tourist spot.

See also
Tourism in Punjab, India
Serai Nurmahal

References

Buildings and structures in Punjab, India
Mughal caravanserais
Ruins in India
Tourist attractions in Patiala
Caravanserais in India